Andrew or Andy Wilson may refer to:

Arts and media
Andrew Wilson (artist) (1780–1848), Scottish landscape-painter
Andrew P. Wilson (1886–after 1947), British director, playwright, teacher, and actor
A. N. Wilson  (Andrew Norman Wilson, born 1950), English writer and columnist
Andrew Wilson (presenter) (born 1960), British news presenter and foreign correspondent
Andrew Wilson (actor) (born 1964), American actor and director
Andrew Wilson (musician), frontman for New Zealand punk trio Die! Die! Die!
Andy Wilson (director) (born 1958), British film, TV and theatre director
Andrew Norman Wilson (artist) (born 1983), artist and curator
Andrew Wilson (ballet dancer), ballet dancer, ballet teacher, choreographer and academic administrator
Andrew Wilson (author) (born 1967), British biographer, novelist and journalist

Sports
Andrew Wilson (footballer, born 1879) (1879–1945), Scottish footballer
Andrew Wilson (footballer, born 1896) (1896–1973), Scottish footballer
Andrew Wilson (footballer, born in Strathclyde) (fl. 1895–1905), Scottish footballer for Sunderland
Andrew Wilson (Wellington cricketer) (1954–2018), New Zealand cricketer, played for Wellington 1979/80
Andrew Wilson (rugby league) (born 1963), English rugby league player
Andrew Wilson (rugby union) (born 1980), South African born Scottish rugby union footballer
Andrew Wilson (baseball), Negro league baseball player
Andrew Wilson (basketball), American college basketball player and coach
Andrew Wilson (canoeist) (born 1964), Australian slalom canoeist
Andrew Wilson (curler), Scottish curler
Andrew Wilson (golfer) (born 1994), English golfer
Andrew Wilson (swimmer) (born 1993), American swimmer
Andrew Wilson (windsurfer) (born 1975), Maltese windsurfer
Andy Wilson (cyclist) (1902–1926), British Olympic cyclist
Andy Wilson (cricketer) (1910–2002), English first class cricketer
Andy Wilson (English footballer) (born 1940), English footballer
Andy Wilson (Australian rules footballer) (born 1951), former Australian rules footballer
Andy Wilson (wrestler) (1916–1979), British Olympic wrestler

Other
Andrew Wilson (traveller) (1831–1881), Scottish traveller and author
Andrew Wilson (Australian politician) (1844–1906), politician in Queensland, Australia
Andrew Wilson (zoologist) (1852–1912), Scottish physiologist, zoologist and author
Andrew Wilson (architect) (1866–1950), Western Australian architect
Andrew Wilson (RAF officer) (born 1941), Royal Air Force commander
Andrew Wilson (academic) (born 1950), American religious scholar
Andrew Wilson (garden designer) (born 1959), British garden designer, lecturer and writer
Andrew Wilson (historian) (born 1961), British historian
Andrew Wilson (classical archaeologist) (born 1968), British archaeologist
Andrew Wilson (economist) (born 1970), Scottish politician 
Andrew Wilson (businessman) (born 1974), present CEO of Electronic Arts

Fiction
Instinct (American TV series)#Main